Sachtleben is a surname. Notable people with the surname include:

Bethany Sachtleben (born 1992), American long-distance runner
Horst Sachtleben (1930–2022), German actor and director
William Sachtleben (1866–1953), American journalist and activist

German-language surnames
Surnames from nicknames